Vijay Bhausaheb Thorat (Marathi pronunciation: [baːɭaːsaːɦeb t̪ʰoɾaːt̪], born 7 February 1953) is an Indian politician who served as the revenue minister in Maharashtra state.
He also served as the Deputy Leader of the Opposition in the Maharashtra Legislative Assembly.  Thorat is a senior member of the Congress Party. He is an MLA from Sangamner constituency.

Thorat is a key figure in the cooperative movement and is the founder of a milk co-operative and former president of the Sangamner District and State Cooperative Bank.

He is recognised for his work in Sangamner taluka and Akole taluka. He has founded cooperative educational institutions in Sangamner. Previously, he served as Minister of Agriculture and as Minister of Revenue, and Khar Lands in the Government of Maharashtra.

Early life 
Thorat was born on 7 February 1953 to late Bhausaheb Thorat. He was named as Vijay. His father Bhausaheb Thorat was a peasant leader in Maharashtra and a one-time legislator from Sangamner constituency. Bhausaheb Thorat defeated the then political heavyweight of Maharashtra B. J. Khatal-Patil, a minister in the Maharashtra's government for sixteen-years, in the 1978 Assembly elections as a candidate of INC.

Education 
Thorat obtained his LLB degree from ILS Law College, Pune in 1977 and BA from Ferguson college, Pune University in 1975.

Political career 
He began his political career as an Independent and fought for the Sangamner Vidhan Sabha seat and won with a margin of 10,159 votes on Shakuntala Khanderao Horat. From then he never looked back and won 8 assembly elections never getting defeated in any elections as a candidate of INC.

He was the Minister of State for agriculture in the first Vilasrao Deshmukh's government. Later in 2004 he was elevated to the rank of cabinet minister along with Anil Deshmukh of NCP. He was one of those few leaders in Maharashtra who served as ministers in the 15-year Congress-NCP alliance. He served as the minister of Agriculture, Water Conservation, Employment Guarantee Scheme and Additional charge of School Education in Prithviraj Chavan's cabinet. He is a well-known and a leading face in the cooperative movement of Maharashtra. His nephew Satyajeet Tambe Patil is also a politician in Ahmadnagar district and a two-time member of Ahmadnagar Municipality.

Thorat was made the MPCC chief in 2019 when Ashok Chavan resigned following the weak performance of the party in the Lok Sabha elections. Thorat had to battle with the large-scale defections from his party to the ruling alliance. Due to defections the Congress's tally in the assembly fell down decisively.

Under his leadership the party improved its tally from 31 legislators in the assembly to 44 legislators. After the 2019 political turmoil in Maharashtra with the formation of a post-poll alliance called Maha Vikas Aghadi by the Congress, NCP and Shiv Sena, Thorat was sworn in as a minister in the Uddhav Thackeray administration.

Thorat resigned as the leader of the Congress in Legislature in 2023.

Political statistics

Positions held 
 1985–present     - Member of Legislative Assembly, Maharashtra.
 1999–2004        - Minister of State for Agriculture, Govt. of Maharashtra
 2004-2014        - Cabinet Minister, Govt. of Maharashtra
 14 July 2019 – 5 February 2021 - PCC Chief, Maharashtra 
 26 November 2019 - 2023 - Congress Legislative Party leader, Maharashtra Legislative Assembly
 28 November 2019 – 2023 - Cabinet Minister for Revenue, Govt. of Maharashtra
 8 January 2020 - Guardian minister Kolhapur 
 Permanent invitee - Congress Working Committee

References

Marathi politicians
Cooperatives in Maharashtra
Forestry in India
Water conservation in India
1953 births
Living people
Maharashtra MLAs 2014–2019
Maharashtra MLAs 1985–1990
Maharashtra MLAs 1990–1995
Maharashtra MLAs 1995–1999
Maharashtra MLAs 1999–2004
Maharashtra MLAs 2004–2009
Maharashtra MLAs 2009–2014
Maharashtra MLAs 2019–2024
Deputy opposition leaders
   5. "Bharat Jodo Yatra received huge support in the state Balasaheb Thorat" Akole News